The End of the Line is a 1957 British crime film directed by Charles Saunders and starring Alan Baxter, Barbara Shelley, Ferdy Mayne and Jennifer Jayne. The film was released in the United States in 1959. It was made at Southall Studios in West London.

Plot
Mike (Alan Baxter), an American author living in England gets involved with the wife of a jewel fence. The wife, Lilianne (Barbara Shelley), then persuades Mike to rob her husband, whilst at the same time giving him a fake alibi. But soon after the robbery when the jewel fence winds up dead, Mike begins to get blackmailed.

Cast

 Alan Baxter as Mike Selby  
 Barbara Shelley as Liliane Crawford  
 Ferdy Mayne as Edwards  
 Jennifer Jayne as Anne Bruce  
 Arthur Gomez as John Crawford  
 Geoffrey Hibbert as Max Perrin  
 Jack Melford as Inspector Gates  
 Charles Clay as Henry Bruce
 Marianne Brauns as Sally 
 Sheldon Allan as Barman
 Harry Towb as Vince
 Barbara Cochran as Cynthia
 Colin Rix as Detective Parker
 Stella Bonheur as Mrs. Edwards
 Charles Cameron as Publican

References

External links

1957 films
British crime films
1957 crime films
Films directed by Charles Saunders
Films shot at Southall Studios
Films set in London
1950s English-language films
1950s British films